Coptotriche heinemanni is a moth of the  family Tischeriidae. It is found in most of Europe, except the Iberian Peninsula and the Balkan Peninsula.

The wingspan is 8–9.5 mm.

References

External links
Larval Stage info

Moths described in 1871
Tischeriidae
Moths of Japan
Moths of Europe
Taxa named by Maximilian Ferdinand Wocke